AryoGen Pharmed is an Iranian biopharmaceutical company specializing in manufacturing Therapeutic Monoclonal antibodies and some other recombinant proteins.

History
AryoGen is a biopharmaceutical company created on the mandate of Iranian executive branch. It was created by a group of scientific experts spun off a Biopharmaceutical company, which formed a new entity named AryoGen Pharmed which started its production in 2011. It was deemed an issue of national interest due to the importance of the target products on Iran's community health care system, as well as its impact in the region and globally.

AryoGen is the world's first company to produce biosimilar Blood Coagulation Factor VII, which required a 50 million Euro investment. Also AryoGen has established a monoclonal antibody production line, making it one of only 10 manufacturers in the world.

AryoGen changed its name to AryoGen Pharmed in 2016.

AryoGen Pharmed (AryoGen) has received a Good Manufacturing Practice (GMP) certificate from the European Medicines Agency (EMA), becoming one of the first monoclonal antibody (mAb) manufacturers in the Middle East and North Africa (MENA) region to be certified.

Products 
AryoGen's products include:
 Blood Coagulation factor VII with the name of AryoSeven which is a biosimilar form of Novoseven with multi billion dollars world market and is used for hemophilia patients and other conditions
 Altebrel with the generic name of Etanercept and original trade name of Enbrel which for some years was the no. one in the biopharmaceutical market and is used for treatment of autoimmune diseases
 Zytux with the generic name of Rituximab and original trade name of Rituxan which is an anticancer biomedicine,
 َAryoTrust with the generic name of trastuzumab and original name of Herceptin which is a revolutionary drug in treatment of breast cancer
 Stivant with the generic name of bevacizumab and original trade name of Avestin and is used for treatment of some sort of cancer.
AryoSeven is now approved by Iranian food and drug organisation and from August 2012 is in the market and other biomedicines are closing to the market.

See also
Healthcare in Iran

References

External links
 AryoGen - Home
 Hemophilia
 List of biopharmaceutical companies
 Launching domestic manufacture of anti-hemophilia drug
 Related Clinical trials

Biopharmaceutical companies
Pharmaceutical companies of Iran
Pharmaceutical companies established in 2009